Sean Michael Rooney (born November 13, 1982) is an American volleyball player, a member of American national team, a gold medalist of the Olympic Games 2008 Beijing and FIVB World League (2008, 2014).

Early life
Rooney was born in Wheaton, Illinois. He attended Wheaton Warrenville South High School and was named the 2001 Illinois State Co-Player of the Year (Greg Pochopien – Carl Sandburg High School) and led the team to the state championship. In addition to volleyball, he also played golf and basketball.

College
Rooney attended Pepperdine in Malibu, California, where he graduated in 2005 with a degree in business administration.

During his NCAA career, he was a four-time American Volleyball Coaches Association (AVCA) All-American. By the end of his career, he ranked second nationally among NCAA Division I-II players in points per game, as he had 6.35 in 2005. He was named the 2005 Division I-II National Player of the Year.

In 2005, he led Pepperdine to the NCAA Men's Volleyball Championship, as they defeated UCLA on the Bruins' home floor in five sets. It was the first time in 35 years UCLA lost at home during the NCAA tournament. Rooney was named the Most Valuable Player of the Final Four.

Professional
During the winters of 2006 and 2007, Rooney played for the Cheonan Hyundai Capital Skywalkers in the South Korean League, where he garnered Most Valuable Player awards after leading the team to two consecutive Korean League titles.

In the 2007–08 season, he played for Dinamo-Yantar in Kaliningrad, Russia.

In the 2008–09 season, Rooney played with Fakel Novy Urengoy volleyball club based in Russia.

AVP
Rooney briefly joined the AVP beach volleyball tour, where he played in 2005 and 2006. His highest placing was fifth, which he achieved three times.

National team

International
In 2008, Rooney was named "Best Spiker" of the NORCECA Continental Olympic Qualifying tournament on January 6–11 in Caguas, Puerto Rico. He finished the tournament with 46 points on 43 kills and three blocks. The U.S. men won the tournament and qualified for the 2008 Olympic Games.

In 2007, Rooney was named the Most Valuable Player of the U.S. men's match against Egypt at the FIVB World Cup. Rooney scored 18 points on 15 kills, two blocks and one ace as the United States won in straight sets.

Olympics
Rooney made his Olympic debut at the 2008 Summer Olympics, helping Team USA to a gold medal.  He also was on the 2012 Olympic team.

References

External links
 
 

1982 births
Living people
American men's volleyball players
American men's beach volleyball players
Volleyball players at the 2008 Summer Olympics
Volleyball players at the 2012 Summer Olympics
Olympic gold medalists for the United States in volleyball
Medalists at the 2008 Summer Olympics
Volleyball players at the 2007 Pan American Games
Sportspeople from Wheaton, Illinois
Pepperdine Waves men's volleyball players
Expatriate volleyball players in South Korea
Pan American Games silver medalists for the United States
Pan American Games medalists in volleyball
Medalists at the 2007 Pan American Games
Outside hitters